The 1944–45 season was the sixth Scottish football season in which Dumbarton competed in regional football during World War II.

Scottish Southern League

Four seasons of improving performances were not to be continued, with Dumbarton suffering a disastrous start to their fifth season in the Southern League campaign which saw only 3 points earned from the first 11 games.  Things were not helped by a high 'turn-over' of playing staff and Dumbarton slumped to 13th out of 16 in the Scottish Southern League with 21 points - 38 behind champions Rangers.

League Cup South

Dumbarton again failed to escape from their qualifying section in the League Cup South, winning one and drawing two of their qualifying matches.

Summer Cup

Dumbarton suffered another first round defeat in the Summer Cup, this time to Partick Thistle.

Player statistics

|}

Source:

Transfers

Players in

Players out 

Source:

Reserve team
Dumbarton's Second XI had similar disappointing fortunes during the season to the first team.

In the Scottish Second XI Cup, Dumbarton lost in the first round to Falkirk, and finished 9th (of 11) in the Glasgow & District Reserve League.

References

Dumbarton F.C. seasons
Scottish football clubs 1944–45 season